Alexeis Argilagos (born ) is a former Cuban male volleyball player. He was part of the Cuba men's national volleyball team. He competed with the national team at the 2000 Summer Olympics in Sydney, Australia, finishing 7th.

See also
 Cuba at the 2000 Summer Olympics

References

External links
 profile at sports-reference.com
 

1971 births
Living people
Cuban men's volleyball players
Place of birth missing (living people)
Volleyball players at the 2000 Summer Olympics
Olympic volleyball players of Cuba
Pan American Games medalists in volleyball
Pan American Games gold medalists for Cuba
Medalists at the 1999 Pan American Games